Savli is a village near Vadodara, Gujarat in Western India. It is located near one of the Gujarat Industrial Development Corporation centres, which includes companies such as Nirma Chemical, Bombardier Transportation (now acquired by Alstom) coach factory, ABB India, Voith Hydro, Thermax, etc. A branch of Santram Mandir is also located in this village near the Mahi River.

Economy
Gujarat Industrial Development Corporation (GIDC) owned industrial estate spread over 800 hectares housing several engineering- and electronics-related multinational companies. The region has gained prominence since it falls on the Savli-Halol route of the Delhi–Mumbai Industrial Corridor Project (DMIC). Also, Savli has also been recognised as a location for Export Promotion Industrial Park (EPIP) which is proposed to be elevated to Special Economic Zone (SEZ).

In 2009, Bombardier Transportation (now acquired by Alstom) opened a Movia car manufacturing and electrical component manufacturing Plant, employing nearly 500 people. The plant houses a 2.5 km of testing metro track. The plant manufactures coaches for Delhi Metro and the New Generation Rollingstock trains for Brisbane, Australia. The plant will also manufacture trainsets for Delhi - Meerut RRTS

Energy company Thermax is investing around Rs 1,000 crore in Savli to add substantially to its manufacturing capacity. German players Voith Siemens and R+B Filter GmbH will be investing around Rs 150 crore and 50 crore respectively for hydroelectric.

Education
Savli is an education hub for the town and nearby villages. KJIT Savli is one of the prominent educational campus located in savli which provides KG to college level education. It is the largest educational campus in Savli. The K. J. Institute of Engineering and Technology offers offers B.E. and Diploma Courses in Mechanical, Electrical, Civil, Computer - I.T. and Automobile Engineering Branches. 3 Year's BCA - Bachelor of Computer Application course is also available here. K J Vidhya Mandir - KG to 12th Std. Gujarati & English Medium School is approved by Gujarat Board. K. J. Institute of Ayurveda and Research offers 4.5 Year's B.A.M.S. Ayurveda Courses. Government I.T.I., Homeopathy College, Gangotri School is located in savli. Savli Taluka Kelavni Mandal managed Arts & Commerce college, Savli High School and H. P. Sheth Kanya school for girls are crowns of savli.

Connectivity

Savli is connected to all major towns of Gujarat by public transport service operated by GSRTC, with direct routes to Vadodara, Anand, and Godhra.

References

Villages in Vadodara district